These are the full results of the athletics competition at the 2010 Central American Games which took place between April 16 and April 19, 2010 in Ciudad de Panamá, Panamá.

Men's results

100 meters

Heat 1 – Wind: +0.4 m/s

Heat 2 – Wind: +1.1 m/s

Final – Wind: -0.2 m/s

200 meters

Heat 1 – Wind: -0.1 m/s

Heat 2 – Wind: +0.3 m/s

Final – Wind: +0.1 m/s

400 meters
Final

800 meters
Final

1500 meters
Final

5000 meters
Final

10,000 meters
Final

110 meters hurdles
Final – Wind: 0.0 m/s

400 meters hurdles
Final

3000 meters steeplechase
Final

High jump
Final

Long jump
Final

Triple jump
Final

Shot put
Final

Discus throw
Final

Javelin throw
Final

Decathlon
Final

20,000 meters track walk
Final

4 x 100 meters relay
Final

4 x 400 meters relay
Final

Women's results

100 meters

Heat 1 – Wind: +0.3 m/s

Heat 2 – Wind: -0.3 m/s

Final – Wind: +0.2 m/s

200 meters

Heat 1 – Wind: +0.7 m/s

Heat 2 – Wind: -1.0 m/s

Final – Wind: +0.5 m/s

400 meters
Final

800 meters
Final

1500 meters
Final

5000 meters
Final

10,000 meters
Final

100 meters hurdles
Final – Wind: -0.5 m/s

400 meters hurdles
Final

3000 meters steeplechase
Final

High jump
Final

Long jump
Final

Shot put
Final

Discus throw
Final

Hammer throw
Final

Javelin throw
Final

Heptathlon
Final

4 x 100 meters relay
Final

4 x 400 meters relay
Final

References

Central American Games
2010